Adin Vrabac (born 27 January 1994) is a Bosnian professional basketball player for BC GGMT Vienna of the Austrian Basketball Superliga. He is a 2.06 m (6 ft 9 in) tall small forward. He is also a member of the Bosnia and Herzegovina national team.

Professional career
Adin Vrabac started his career with OKK Spars Sarajevo in the Bosnian League. In 2013, he was promoted to the first team. Vrabac averaged 10.7 points, 3.1 rebounds and 2.6 assists.

On 26 June 2014, Vrabac signed a four-year contract with German club TBB Trier. On 14 March 2015, Vrabac was the most efficient player in his team with Vitalis Chikoko against Alba Berlin in Mercedes-Benz Arena, he scored 18 points and had 3 rebounds. In 2014–15 Basketball Bundesliga, he averaged 6.3 points, 2.3 rebounds and 1.2 assists.

On 30 September 2015, Vrabac signed a two-year contract with Serbian club Partizan.

On 4 August 2017, Vrabac signed with Spanish club Iberostar Tenerife for the 2017–18 season. On 9 December 2017, he parted ways with Iberostar Tenerife. On 5 January 2018, he signed with German ProA club Hamburg Towers for the rest of the 2017–18 season.
On 6 August 2018, he came back to Bosnia and Herzegovina and signed with Spars for the 2018–19 season. Vrabac won the Bosnian Cup, officially known as the Mirza Delibašić Cup in the 2019–20 season on 16 February 2020, beating Igokea in the final. Vrabac signed in Slovenia with Krka on 17 July 2020.

On 22 June 2022, Vrabac signed for Belfius Mons-Hainaut of the BNXT League.

National team career
Vrabac has also been a member of the senior men's Bosnia and Herzegovina national basketball team. With Bosnia's senior national team, he played at the EuroBasket 2015.

Career statistics

Domestic and regional leagues

|-
| style="text-align:left;"| 2013–14 
| style="text-align:left;"| OKK Spars 
|| Bosnian League || 30 ||  || 25.7 || .548 || .216 || .631 || 3.1 || 2.6 || 1 || .2 || 10.7
|-
| style="text-align:left;"| 2014–15 
| style="text-align:left;"| TBB Trier 
|| BBL || 32 ||  || 19.6 || .460 || .244 || .526 || 2.3 || 1.2 || .3 || .2 || 6.3
|-
| style="text-align:left;"| 2015–16 
| style="text-align:left;"| Partizan 
|| ABA League || 25 ||  || 15.6 || .379 || .143 || .333 || 4.7 || 1.7 || 2.3 || .7 || 4.2
|-class="sortbottom"

Honours
 National Cups (1×):
 Bosnian Cup: 1 (with Spars Sarajevo: 2019–20)
 International Cups (1×):
 FIBA Intercontinental Cup: 1 (with Canarias: 2017)

References

External links
 Adin Vrabac at aba-liga.com

1994 births
Living people
ABA League players
Basketball League of Serbia players
Basketball players from Sarajevo
BC Zepter Vienna players
Belfius Mons-Hainaut players
Bosnia and Herzegovina expatriate basketball people in Serbia
Bosnia and Herzegovina expatriate basketball people in Spain
Bosnia and Herzegovina men's basketball players
CB Canarias players
Hamburg Towers players
KK Krka players
KK Partizan players
Liga ACB players
OKK Spars players

Small forwards